The Thomson–East Coast Line (TEL) is a medium-capacity Mass Rapid Transit (MRT) line in Singapore. Coloured brown on the rail map, it is fully underground. It runs along a combined north–south and east–west corridor, starting in the north at Woodlands town, passing through Upper Thomson and the towns of Ang Mo Kio and Bishan, before heading south to Orchard Road and Marina Bay, then running eastwards along the east coast through Kallang, Marine Parade and Bedok South, before ending at Upper East Coast.

The line was announced by the Land Transport Authority on 15 August 2014, merging the previously planned Thomson (TSL) and Eastern Region (ERL) lines. By then, construction of the Thomson Line had begun in January 2014. The line is currently being opened in 5 stages, with Stage 1 (from Woodlands North to Woodlands South) opened on 31 January 2020. Stage 2 (from Springleaf to Caldecott) opened on 28 August 2021. Stage 3 (from Caldecott to Gardens by the Bay) opened on 13 November 2022.

In January 2019, an infill station Founders' Memorial station was announced, with the LTA considering to integrate the Changi Airport Branch into the TEL. When fully opened, it is expected to serve about 500,000 commuters daily in the initial years, rising to one million commuters daily in the long term. It is the fourth MRT line to be operated by SMRT Trains Ltd and also the fourth to be completely automated and driverless. The line is currently served by Mandai Depot, with the East Coast Integrated Depot opening in 2025, and services are operated by CT251 trains.

New signage was introduced to all the stations along the Thomson-East Coast Line, which will see less text and more illustration instead. Moreover, all the MRT lines are now represented by their initials while the exits are represented numerically.

History

Thomson Line 

The Thomson Line was first announced on 25 January 2008.

On 16 June 2011, the Land Transport Authority announced the location of the depot for the line, which was due to begin construction at the end of 2012. It also announced Woodlands as an interchange with the existing North South Line and an additional station located near to Republic Polytechnic.

On 29 August 2012, it was announced that the completion of Thomson Line was pushed back to 2019 onwards instead of the indicative timeline of 2018 announced in the Land Transport Masterplan.

Construction of the Thomson line began in January 2014.

The groundbreaking ceremony took place on 27 June that year at Woodlands. All the working station names were confirmed as the final names except for Sin Ming station which was changed to Bright Hill.

Eastern Region Line

The Eastern Region Line (ERL) was first announced on 23 October 2001. In its preliminary plans, ERL was to have been a 40 kilometre rectangular loop that would complement the existing East West line and enhance inter- and intra-town travelling in the eastern region. It would have looped around the Jalan Besar and East Coast areas, intersecting the Circle Line and other lines along the way, benefiting residents in Tampines, Bedok, Marine Parade, MacPherson and Kaki Bukit. The northern part of the Eastern Region Line became the third stage of the Downtown Line. The southern part of the Eastern Region Line became the East Coast stretch of the Thomson-East Coast line. Sungei Bedok would become an interchange between the Downtown and the Thomson-East Coast lines.

On 11 July 2012, Josephine Teo, Minister of State, Ministry of Finance and Ministry of Transport, announced that the Land Transport Authority is starting architectural and engineering consultancy studies for the Eastern Region Line, which will eventually connect to the Thomson Line.

The director of rail services from the Land Transport Authority, Melvyn Thong, said on 29 May 2013 at the Modern Railways conference that there are plans to extend the Eastern Region Line to the future Changi Airport Terminal 4 which was at that time, set to be ready by 2017 but on 1 June that year, the Land Transport Authority clarified that the Eastern Region Line will not provide an MRT link to the planned Terminal 4. On 30 August that year, Minister of State for Transport Josephine Teo unveiled plans that it will be linked to the future Changi Airport Terminal 5, a mega terminal, which will be the largest terminal in Singapore upon completion in the 2030s.

Merging of Eastern Region Line and Thomson Line
The Eastern Region Line was merged with the Thomson Line on 15 August 2014 to form the Thomson–East Coast Line, extending the project from three to five stages, with nine more stations.

The groundbreaking ceremony for the East Coast stretch took place at Marine Parade on 21 July 2016. All the working station names, including Xilin on the Downtown Line extension, were confirmed as the final names except for Amber station which was changed to Tanjong Katong. The authorities are also considering extending the Thomson–East Coast line to all terminals at Changi Airport, including the upcoming Terminal 5, announced Transport Minister Khaw Boon Wan.

Line operations
SMRT Trains Ltd was appointed as the operator of the line on 15 September 2017.

On 28 August 2019, the Land Transport Authority awarded several non-fare businesses along the line, with Asiaray Connect awarded an advertising contract and a consortium, made up of SMRT Experience, JR Business Development SEA and Alphaplus Investments appointed to run retail space. This is the first time the LTA outsourced these non-fare businesses.

On 19 September that year, Transport Minister Khaw Boon Wan revealed that the opening of the first stage of the Thomson–East Coast Line from Woodlands North to Woodlands South stations was delayed to January 2020 from the indicative time of 2019 announced earlier, subsequently confirmed as 31 January 2020. Self-assistance kiosks were installed at all TEL MRT stations and will be rolled out to all stations.

On 11 January 2020, SMRT and LTA hosted an open house for the first stage of the line, with the stage opening for revenue service on 31 January 2020.

The opening of the second stage was initially delayed to the first quarter of 2021 due to the effects of the COVID-19 pandemic circuit breaker period; the project was subsequently further delayed to the third quarter of 2021.

On 30 April 2021, LTA handed over Stage 2 stations along the line to SMRT to get the section ready for operations. On 30 June 2021, Transport Minister S. Iswaran announced that Stage 2 will open on 28 August 2021. LTA announced on 13 August 2021 that there would be a virtual open house held from 23 to 27 August 2021 since all physical open houses were disallowed due to the COVID-19 pandemic.

The second stage of the line, extending the line from Woodlands South to Caldecott, opened on 28 August 2021.

On 23 November 2021, LTA announced that Mount Pleasant and Marina South stations will only open when housing developments in these areas are ready, instead of opening as part of Stage 3. On 9 March 2022, Transport Minister S Iswaran announced in Parliament that TEL 3 would open in the 2nd half of 2022.

On 17 August 2022, LTA handed over Stage 3 stations along the line to SMRT to get the section ready for operations by the end of 2022.

Airport extension

On 25 May 2019, LTA confirmed that it will extend the Thomson–East Coast Line from Sungei Bedok to Changi Airport Terminal 5. Construction works to extend the TEL to the existing Changi Airport MRT station, which is a terminal station of the East West MRT line commenced in 2020. The stretch of East West MRT line between Tanah Merah and Changi Airport will be converted to form part of the Thomson–East Coast Line extension. The extension is expected to begin construction after 2022, with train services commencing by 2040.

Network and operations

Route 
The 30.4-kilometer (18.9 mi) Thomson-East Coast line runs in a north-south direction between Woodlands North and Gardens by the Bay stations and west-east direction between Gardens by the Bay and Sungei Bedok stations. Beginning at Woodlands North, the line runs south passing the neighbourhood of Woodlands. Between Woodlands South and Springleaf, a branch has been implied for trains going to Mandai depot. It continues heading south-east, bypassing Ang Mo Kio, towards Lentor before curving south towards Mayflower station. 

After Bright Hill station, the line curves south towards Caldecott station before curving west passing the unopened Mount Pleasant towards Stevens station, which it has an interchange with the Downtown line. From Napier station, the line heads east towards Orchard station, also interchanging with the North-South line.

It continues heading south between Orchard and Havelock stations, cutting underneath the Singapore River before heading south-east towards Outram Park station, which has an interchange with the East-West and North-East lines. It then enters the Downtown Core, by heading in a south-east direction towards Marina Bay station, which also has an interchange with the North-South and Circle lines. The line then heads north-east towards Gardens by the Bay, the current terminus of the line. 

From 2024, upon the completion of Stage 4, the line will pass underneath the Kallang Basin, before banking north passing Founders’ Memorial station, which it was scheduled to complete in 2027, but then curves eastwards between Tanjong Rhu and Bayshore station, paralleling Marine Parade Road. 

In 2025, the line will continue east towards Sungei Bedok, the future terminus which it has an interchange with the Downtown line.

Stations
Station codes for the line are brown, corresponding to the line's colour on the system map. Most stations are island stations, with the exception of Napier, Maxwell, Shenton Way and Marina Bay stations, which have stacked side platforms. Future stations Katong Park and Tanjong Katong are planned to also have stacked side platforms, and Tanjong Rhu station is planned to have side platforms.

Legend

List

Depots

Technical details

Train control

The Thomson–East Coast Line is equipped with Alstom Urbalis 400 Communications-based train control (CBTC) moving block signalling system with Automatic train control (ATC) under Automatic train operation (ATO) GoA 4 (UTO). The subsystems consist of Automatic train protection (ATP) to govern train speed, Iconis Automatic Train Supervision (ATS) to track and schedule trains and Smartlock Computer-based interlocking (CBI) system that prevents incorrect signal and track points to be set. 

Alstom will also be supplying platform screen doors for the Thomson–East Coast Line.

Rolling stock 

The first generation of rolling stock being introduced onto the Thomson–East Coast Line is the CT251, built by Kawasaki Heavy Industries & CRRC Qingdao Sifang in Qingdao, China. The trains are built with 5 doors per side per car similar to that of Hong Kong MTR trains or Type A trains in China, which is the very first in Singapore to have this configuration. They are also completely automated and driverless. The trains are housed at the Mandai Depot and the future East Coast Integrated Depot (shared with the Downtown and the East West lines).

See also 
 Transport in Singapore

References

External links
 
 Thomson–East Coast Line

Mass Rapid Transit (Singapore) lines
Proposed public transport in Singapore
Buildings and structures under construction in Singapore
Railway lines opened in 2020
2020 establishments in Singapore
Automated guideway transit